Jacko  may refer to:

People

First name
 Jacko Eisenberg (born 1980), Israeli singer
 Jacko McDonagh (born 1962), Irish footballer

Nickname
 Jacko Barry (born 1975), Irish darts player
 Jacko Fossett (1922–2004), English clown
 Jacko Gill (born 1994), New Zealand shot putter
 Jacko Heaslip (1899–1966), Irish cricketer
 Mark Jackson (Australian footballer) (born 1959), Australian rules footballer
 Michael Jackson (1958–2009), American entertainer nicknamed "Wacko Jacko"
 Hidalgo Moya (1920–1994), American architect
 Jacko Page (born 1959), British Army general

Surname
 Edward W. Jacko (1916–1979) American civil rights attorney
 Mário Jacko (born 1996), Slovak footballer
 Patrik Jacko (born 1992), Slovak footballer, cousin of Mário Jacko

Ring name
 Ali Jacko, ring name of English kickboxer Abdul Ali (born 1969)

Other uses
 Jacko, claimed world record-holding rat-baiting terrier
The Jacko or The Dartmouth Jack-O-Lantern, American college humor magazine

See also
 Jacko Hoax, an 1884 cryptid hoax reported in British Columbia
 Jack-O, a 1995 American horror film
 Džeko (surname)
 Jaco (disambiguation)
 Jako (disambiguation)
 Jakko

Lists of people by nickname